John David Jones (June 26, 1923 – October 7, 2014) was a Welsh-American politician in the state of Washington. He served in the Washington House of Representatives and Washington State Senate as a Republican.

References

1923 births
2014 deaths
Republican Party Washington (state) state senators
Republican Party members of the Washington House of Representatives
British emigrants to the United States